Doug Dalton is an American entrepreneur and investor. He is the current owner of the FutureBars, the parent company of several San Francisco establishments including: Bourbon and Branch, Rickhouse, Pagan Idol, Bottle Club Pub, Swig, Lark, Local Edition, Devils Acre, Zombie Village, Nightingale, Gingers and the Cask liquor stores.

Education
From 1990 to 1994, Dalton received his bachelor's degree in computer science from Emory & Henry College. He continued his education at George Mason University, receiving his master's degree in computer science in 1996.

Career

During his time as a lead engineer at Sprint, Dalton created the company's foundation for domestic internet.  From there he went on to work on the core technology for the framework for Netscape's web site as the Senior Manager of Network Engineering and New Technologies. In 1998, Dalton became the Vice President of Engineering and Operations at Knowledge Universe.

In 2000, Dalton entered the electronic commerce sector becoming Chief Technology Officer for Gloss.com, a high-end online cosmetics company. When Estée Lauder Companies absorbed Gloss.com Dalton became CTO of Estee Lauder.  Dalton relocated to New York City, where Estee Lauder was headquartered, and while living there discovered an interest for the New York nightlife.  He took this newfound interest to San Francisco and improved upon it by developing a different type of nightlife culture that would thrive longer than the typical and cyclical bar life expectancy.

Dalton returned to San Francisco in 2002 and translated his knowledge of data mining customer's needs and desires to understand San Francisco's nightlife market. He compared this with what he had absorbed from the New York culture he experienced and began what would become a changing movement in the San Francisco nightlife industry.

Dalton teamed up with Brian Sheehy and Dahi Donnelly to create Futurebars, a parent company for concept bars and a consulting group for clients such as Ritz Carlton, Marriott, and W Hotels. Futurebars introduces a unique identity and concept to each bar they open and help shape each bar with their consulting services. As an owner of Futurebars, Dalton is a proprietor of: Local Edition, Tradition, Swig, Bourbon & Branch, Rickhouse, The Devil's Acre, and Tupper and Reed.  These bars have been the leading lights of the cocktail culture that blossomed in San Francisco. and in 2012 had a gross revenue of over $7 million.

References

External links
Futurebars
 Local Edition
Bourbon and Branch

1972 births
Living people
People from Fairfax, Virginia